Zavyalovo is the name of several rural localities in Russia:
Zavyalovo, Altai Krai, a selo in Zavyalovsky Selsoviet of Zavyalovsky District of Altai Krai
Zavyalovo, Iskitimsky District, Novosibirsk Oblast, a selo in Iskitimsky District, Novosibirsk Oblast
Zavyalovo, Toguchinsky District, Novosibirsk Oblast, a selo in Toguchinsky District, Novosibirsk Oblast
Zavyalovo, Omsk Oblast, a selo in Zavyalovsky Rural Okrug of Znamensky District of Omsk Oblast
Zavyalovo, Perm Krai, a village in Sivinsky District of Perm Krai
Zavyalovo, Tyumen Oblast, a village in Tobolovsky Rural Okrug of Ishimsky District of Tyumen Oblast
Zavyalovo, Udmurt Republic, a selo in Zavyalovsky Selsoviet of Zavyalovsky District of the Udmurt Republic